Conomurex decorus, common name : the Mauritian Conch,  is a species of sea snail, a marine gastropod mollusk in the family Strombidae, the true conchs.

Description
The shell size varies between 35 mm and 80 mm.

Distribution
 Mediterranean Sea
 Red Sea
 Indian Ocean near Aldabra Atoll, the Mascarene Basin, Mauritius and Tanzania
 Pacific Ocean near Singapore.

References

External links
 

Strombidae
Gastropods described in 1798